Jordan Lane (born 20 October 1997) is an English professional rugby league  player who plays as a  forward for Hull F.C. in the Super League.

He has spent time on loan at Doncaster in League 1.

Background
Lane was born in Kingston upon Hull, East Riding of Yorkshire, England.

Career
In 2018 he made his Super League début for Hull against the Leeds Rhinos.

In October 2017 Lane agreed to join Doncaster on loan for the 2018 season.

In September 2019, Lane was awarded with Hull FC's Young Player of the Year award.

References

External links
Hull FC profile
SL profile

1997 births
Living people
Doncaster R.L.F.C. players
England Knights national rugby league team players
English rugby league players
Hull F.C. players
Rugby league second-rows
Rugby league players from Kingston upon Hull